Særslev is a village in Denmark with a population of 757 (1 January 2022), located in Nordfyn municipality on the island of Fyn.

Notable people 
 Carl Peter Hermann Christensen (1869 in Særslev – 1936) the last executioner (skarpretter) in office for the government of Denmark; he never conducted any executions.
 Aage Berntsen (1885 in Særslev – 1952) a Danish fencer, poet, doctor and artist; he competed in five events at the 1920 Summer Olympics

References

External links
Nordfyn municipality

Cities and towns in the Region of Southern Denmark
Nordfyn Municipality